Spencer Anthony Hawk (born March 26, 1999), also known by their stage name Gupi (stylized as gupi), is an American electronic musician. Gupi is the child of skateboarder Tony Hawk.

Biography 
As a child, Hawk's mother encouraged them to learn the guitar, which started their interest in music. In school, they played in a rock band with several of their friends. When they discovered artists like Skrillex and Deadmau5, Hawk decided to pursue electronic music instead. They worked on electronic music throughout middle school and high school, and connected with other producers through SoundCloud. Hawk originally made music under the name W3N, but began releasing music as Gupi in 2016, when they were 17.

In 2018, Hawk released their second EP, All, through the record label RORA Team. Charli XCX heard their EP and asked them to do a session with her for her 2019 album, Charli. The work that they did was not released on her album, but Hawk had the opportunity to meet and work alongside A. G. Cook and Dylan Brady. In February 2020, Hawk released their debut album, None, through Dog Show Records, a record label owned by Brady. In October 2020, Hawk and Fraxiom released Food House under the Food House name, through the same label.

Though their father is supportive of their work, Hawk says that they "[try] to make a very large point of not at all involving [their] dad" so that their accomplishments are considered to be their own.

Hawk is currently pursuing a degree in electronic production at Berklee.

Artistry 

Ben Mangelsdorf of Underground Underdogs describes Gupi's music as experimental pop and compares it to the music of Sophie and Skrillex. Kyle Whiting of 34th Street Magazine calls Gupi's album None an "exhilarating thrillride of maximalist club tracks" that draw elements from genres like bubblegum bass, house, and dubstep. Matt Moen of Paper notes that the lead single from None, "Thos Moser", includes lyrics with multiple "irreverent non-sequiturs and pop culture shout outs".

Hawk states their musical influences as PC Music, System of a Down, Britney Spears, and a picture of Sonic the Hedgehog. They make all of their release artwork in the default Mac application Preview.

Discography

Albums 
None (Dog Show Records, 2020)
you're it (Self-released, 2022)
paper eater (2022)

Collaboration albums 
food house (with Fraxiom as Food House) (Dog Show Records, 2020)

EPs 
 Company (RORA Team, 2017)
 All (RORA Team, 2018)
 Bunny Hill Original Soundtrack (Self-released, 2021)

Singles

Notes

References

External links 
 Gupi's website
 Gupi's Soundcloud
 Gupi – Company EP on the RORA Team Soundcloud

Living people
American electronic musicians
1999 births
Hyperpop musicians